Blood Sisters is a 2022 Nigerian thriller series produced by Netflix. The series, which has been described as the first Nigerian Netflix Original series, stars Ini Dima-Okojie and Nancy Isime in the lead, with Ramsey Noah, Kate Henshaw, Wale Ojo, Kehinde Bankole, Deyemi Okanlawon, Gabriel Afolayan, Tope Tedela among other cast members. The four-part series was released on 5 May 2022 and the release was born of the collaboration of Netflix and Mo Abudu through her media company, Ebonylife TV. Blood Sisters was directed by Biyi Bandele and Kenneth Gyang.

Synopsis
The crime thriller follows the story of two friends, Sarah (Ini Dima-Okojie) and Kemi (Nancy Isime), who became fugitives after Sarah's husband to be, Kola (Deyemi Okanlawon), disappears mysteriously on their engagement day, the circumstances surrounding his disappearance became a mystery to the public until he (Kola) was declared dead few days after when his body was found in a shallow grave. This situation then made Sarah and Kemi wanted fugitives, as they had to leave town in escape for their lives. As everyone tries to find Kola's killer, more secrets about Kola, his siblings, mother and family feud became revealed.

Cast
Ini Dima-Okojie as Sarah Duru
Nancy Isime as Kemi Sanya
Deyemi Okanlawon as Kola Ademola
Gabriel Afolayan as Femi Ademola
Ramsey Noah as Uncle B
Kate Henshaw as Uduak Ademola
Kehinde Bankole as Yinka Ademola
Genoveva Umeh as Timeyin
Uche Jombo as Sarah's mother
Wale Ojo as Inspector Joe
Tope Tedela as Dr Adeboye/The Good Doctor
Toke Makinwa as Abby
Segun Arinze as Tijano
Daniel Etim-Effiong as Akin Bassey

Episodes

Production and release
Blood Sisters was set in Lagos and released on Netflix on 5 May 2022, with the official premiere being held on 4 May 2022. In attendance at the premiere, which featured many Nollywood actors, was Nigeria's Minister for Information and Culture, Lai Mohammed, who lauded the movie and described it as a big plus to the nation's creative industry. The theme of the premiere was "Red and Fugitive", and guests attending the event dressed in accordance with the theme.

Reception
Blood Sisters received positive critical reviews. A reviewer for  Variety described it as "An infectious mix of melodrama, dark humor, and social commentary, the show serves up an authentic depiction of Nigerian culture that's also telling a very universal story. You only need to glimpse the week's headlines to know that women's rights and domestic abuse are still endemic global issues." Twitter users praised the performances of Ini Dima-Okojie, Nancy Isime, Kate Henshaw, Ramsey Noah, Tope Tedela and others and also praised the series for its plot and storyline.

References

External links

2022 Nigerian television series debuts
2022 Nigerian television series endings
English-language Netflix original programming
Nigerian drama television series
Television shows set in Lagos